JDS may refer to:
 J.D.s, a queer punk zine
 Janata Dal (Secular), an Indian political party
 Japan Defense Ship, a ship prefix
 Java Desktop System
 JDS Development, an American real-estate company
 JDS Uniphase Corporation
 Jewish day school
 especially Charles E. Smith Jewish Day School, in Maryland
 John Dewey Society
 Journalists for Democracy in Sri Lanka
 Junior dos Santos, a former UFC Heavyweight Champion.